Felipe Dorta (born 17 June 1996) is an Austrian footballer who plays for Swiss club Brühl.

Career

Club career 
In July 2019, Dorta joined Liechtensteiner club FC Balzers after a spell with South Korean club Ansan Greeners FC. He left the club in July 2019 and joined FC Balzers.

He left Balzers at the end of 2019 and joined fellow league club USV Eschen/Mauren.

In June 2022, Dorta returned to Brühl.

References

External links

 
 Felipe Dorta at ZeroZero
 	

1996 births
Living people
Brazilian emigrants to Austria
Austrian footballers
Austria youth international footballers
SC Rheindorf Altach players
LASK players
FC Juniors OÖ players
SV Austria Salzburg players
FC Wacker Innsbruck (2002) players
Club Athletico Paranaense players
Centro Sportivo Alagoano players
SC Brühl players
Ansan Greeners FC players
FC Balzers players
USV Eschen/Mauren players
2. Liga (Austria) players
Austrian Regionalliga players
Swiss Promotion League players
K League 2 players
People from Erechim
Association football midfielders
Austrian expatriate footballers
Expatriate footballers in South Korea
Expatriate footballers in Switzerland
Expatriate footballers in Liechtenstein
Austrian expatriate sportspeople in South Korea
Austrian expatriate sportspeople in Switzerland
Austrian expatriate sportspeople in Liechtenstein